Foz do Brasil is a Brazilian waste management company, founded in 2008 and headquartered in Limeira. The company is owned by Brazilian conglomerate Odebrecht. The company operates in 150 cities in 18 Brazilian states and has about 9.0 million of customers.

The company invests, operates and develops projects in three segments: Water and Sewer - Public sanitation concessions; Industrial Operations - Outsourcing Centers Utilities, and Waste - diagnosis and remediation of contaminated sites, monitoring of surface and groundwater, and disposal end of MSW. The company closed the year 2011 with the supply of 77 million cubic meters of water, with the collection of 72 million m³ of wastewater beyond 1 million tonnes of waste properly for clients.

The company also has several projects in partnership with various public and private companies in Brazil as the state Sabesp, Copasa, Cesan and others. In the industrial area, Foz do Brazil provides services to major industries in the sectors of metallurgy, petroleum, pulp and paper, mining, steel, chemical and petrochemical, its main customers are Petrobras, Braskem, ThyssenKrupp, Transpetro, Dow, DuPont, Rhodia,  Shell, Klabin, among others.

References 

Companies based in São Paulo (state)
Odebrecht
Waste management companies of Brazil
Limeira
Waste companies established in 2008
Brazilian companies established in 2008